Bohdan Sapieha may refer to:

  (–), statesman of the Grand Duchy of Lithuania, notarius magnus of Lithuania
  (1530–1593), statesman of the Grand Duchy of Lithuania, Minsk voivod, Brest castellan, Belz podkomorzy (Lat.: succamerarius), Homel starost
  (died 1603), statesman of the Grand Duchy of Lithuania, iudex terrestris of Trakai Voivodeship